George Crump may refer to:

 George William Crump (1786–1848), U.S. Representative from Virginia
 George Arthur Crump (1871–1918), hotelier and golf course architect
 George Crump (American football) (born 1959), American football defensive end